Voloder may refer to:

 Voloder, Bosnia and Herzegovina, a village near Bosanska Krupa
 Voloder, Croatia, a village near Popovača